Thomas Baring (1839–1923) was a British banker.

Known as "Tom", Baring was the tenth child (fifth of second marriage) of Henry Baring of Cromer Hall, and younger full brother of Edward Baring, 1st Baron Revelstoke. Like his brother, he was involved in the family banking business, beginning his career in the Liverpool office of Barings Bank. He later moved to New York City to join Kidder Peabody. When, in 1890, Kidder Peabody split its dual Boston-New York firm, Baring became a partner in the separated New York firm. He and another Kidder-Peabody alumnus, George C. Magoun, formed Baring, Magoun. Both houses continued as North American agents for Barings.

Following the near-collapse of Barings, which initiated the Panic of 1890, and the death of senior partner Thomas Charles Baring (a cousin) in 1891, Tom returned to London to become a Managing Director of the reorganized Baring Brothers and Co. Limited in 1892. In 1896 he joined the new Barings partnership formed to oversee the limited company. He remained in both positions until his retirement in 1912. Although Tom was the eldest of the partners, his nephew John Baring, 2nd Baron Revelstoke became head of the firm.

Baring was born at Cromer Hall, Cromer, Norfolk, but never lived there as an adult. The estate was home to his younger brother Evelyn who, after a distinguished career as a statesman, diplomat and colonial administrator, was raised to the peerage as 1st Earl of Cromer.

References

 Baring family genealogy in The Baring Archive
 Baring family portrait collection in The Baring Archive

British bankers
Tom
1839 births
1923 deaths